Ancylopsetta ommata, the Gulf of Mexico ocellated flounder, is a species of large-tooth flounder native to the Atlantic coast of North America and the Gulf of Mexico.

References
 

Paralichthyidae
Fish described in 1883
Taxa named by David Starr Jordan